Mryaushlinsky (Meräweşle) is a rural locality (a village) in Nizhnebikkuzinsky Selsoviet, Kugarchinsky District, Bashkortostan, Russia. The population was 109 as of 2010. There are 2 streets.

Geography 
Mryaushlinsky is located 44 km north of Mrakovo (the district's administrative centre) by road. Nizhnebikkuzino is the nearest rural locality.

References 

Rural localities in Kugarchinsky District